BSAA may refer to:

 British South American Airways
 Business Software Association of Australia, which is now Business Software Alliance Australia
 Bioterrorism Security Assessment Alliance, a fictional counter-terrorism government agency in the Resident Evil franchise